Dezider Ursiny, also known as Dežo Ursiny (4 October 1947 – 2 May 1995) was a Slovak rock musician and a television and film screenwriter and director. He is considered one of the most important personalities of Slovak rock music and one of the most talented and unique Slovak popular music composers. He belongs to a wide group of legends of Czechoslovak Big Beat. Dežo Ursiny was a member of big beat bands The Beatmen, The Soulmen in the 1960s and since the mid-1970s, until his death he pursued a solo-career, composing sophisticated artistic and critically highly praised music, which varied slightly from one album to another and is sometimes hard to define, can be described as jazz rock, or more widely – progressive rock. He composed music to several films, including the popular musical "Neberte nám princeznú" and also shot several documentary movies during his lifetime.

History
Ursiny was born and raised in Bratislava. He attended electrotechnical high school where he made his first musical contacts. He started playing guitar at the age 11, and in the early 1960s he is known to play in the amateur bands Fontána and Jolana. At the end of 1964 he joined The Beatmen as a lead guitarist and singer, and the following year they gained nationwide success in Czechoslovakia. The group played Beatles-like music and wrote critically praised songs, of which 4 were released on two singles. Ursiny, being only 17, wrote their best song, "Let's Make A Summer". However, their success didn't last long and the band didn't manage to build themselves a stable position on the scene and after their breakup they soon disappeared from people's memories. In 1966 the band decided to emigrate to West Germany in search for wider success, limited by the unfriendly political regime, but Ursiny refused to leave his homeland. The band, with a replacement for him soon broke up because of disappointment from the lack of success in the west.

In 1967 Ursiny started studying film and television dramaturgy at the Musical Arts College in Bratislava and from mid-1967 to mid-1968 he was a founding member of The Soulmen, the group that was proclaimed the best at the 1st Czechoslovak Beat Festival in Prague in December 1967. They played Cream-like music and released 4 songs on an EP in the early 1968. In late 1968 he founded The New Soulmen who however disbanded soon thereafter, and didn't release any songs. After the 1968 occupation of Czechoslovakia the situation much worsened for musicians, and it was more difficult to perform and release as freely as before. The normalization removed English from the band names and song lyrics and the song themes were undergoing very strong censorship.

In 1970 he founds the band Provisorium after meeting his lifelong mate, keyboardist Jaro Filip. The band existed shortly in two line-ups, and played only two shows during their existence but managed to arrange a recording deal, before they finally broke up. Ursiny and Filip recorded an album with Czech musicians Vladimír Kulhánek (bass) and Jaroslav Erno Šedivý (drums) from the band Flamengo, whom they first met three days before recording. The album "Dežo Ursiny & Provisorium", with all lyrics in English, was released to a miracle in 1973. It consisted of four songs, with side long track
"Christmas Time". Full of jazzy melodies it is now considered a classic and one of the best Slovak albums ever recorded (as would later be probably every Ursiny's album), but at the time of its release it remained practically unnoticed by the public.

In the same year Ursiny finished his studies and later started working at the Koliba film studios in Bratislava. He escaped military service by fleeing to a psychiatric hospital and in 1974 he met another his lifetime friend, poet Ivan Štrpka, who would remain his almost sole lyricist for the rest of the time. He changes his opinion that only English is the language of rock and all his later recordings will have Slovak lyrics. He considered the lyrics so important that all his albums after his first Slovak one would read "Dežo Ursiny/Ivan Štrpka" as artists on their covers. In 1975 they both start working on the musical trilogy "Gondwana – Laurasia – Pangea", which was later abandoned, and the material was reworked and used differently up to a certain level. The 18-minute-long song "Ostrov" (Island), from his first Slovak album "Pevnina detstva", is a remnant from the original material, named originally "Tristanov ostrov" (Tristan's Island). The album was recorded in late 1977 and released in 1978, and again didn't gain practically any success, partly because it was not at all promoted by the media and the publishing industry, because of various problems with censorship. However the album is also a classic now for the fans of the Czechoslovak progressive scene, and musically it is very much treasured, "Ostrov" is a jazz rock masterpiece, and Štrpka's lyrics are praised as well.

In 1979 another album, "Nové mapy ticha" was released, which introduced shorter songs and some more accessible lyrics (which was, however, even more apparent on several subsequent albums). The backing band was named Burčiak (Federweisser) and with this group Ursiny released also another album "Modrý vrch", which is considered to be his best by the most of his fans and the critics. By this time he had written music to various films, including popular television musical "Neberte nám princeznú" (Don't take the princess away from us), with its songs performed by singers Marika Gombitová, Miroslav Žbirka and Marie Rottrová. Songs from this musical are for sure most remembered by the people from all the music ever written by Ursiny.

In 1983 the album "4/4" was released with the band named Prognóza (Prognosis), and in 1984 "Bez počasia", with band again named Provisorium (the name had then remained on the rest of Ursiny's albums). These brought again simpler lyrics and music, some funky elements which later appeared on subsequent albums. However these albums also failed to make their way to wide public, and next ones "Zelená", "Na ceste domov" again consisted of long tracks. Throughout the time he composed music to another movies, including musical "Niekto ako ja" (Someone like me). He also co-wrote and directed the film "Vôňa života" (Fragrance of life) about sexual education.

In 1989 he was diagnosed with cancer, from which he partly recovered in 1990. In 1991 his movie "O rakovine a nádeji" (Of cancer and hope) was premiered, and in 1992 he released a double album "Ten istý tanec", which included mostly his own lyrics, many of them autobiographical, of meditating character. In 1994 his health grew worse again, he released his final album "Príbeh" which now belongs to his fans' most favourite ones. In December 1994 he played his final show in Prague. He died of cancer on 2 May 1995.

In 1997 and 2000 the two compilation albums "Pevniny a vrchy" and "Pevniny a vrchy 2" were released, which include official recordings from the singles and EPs released during his career as well as various rarities from The Beatmen, The New Soulmen, never released songs or his songs included on albums of other artists. The disc 2 of "Pevniny a vrchy 2" contains live recordings of The Soulmen from the 1st Czechoslovak Beat Festival from 1967 and of Provisorium from 1971, in a very low sound quality. The album "Pevniny a vrchy" was part of the eponymous biography or Ursiny by Marián Jaslovský.

Discography

With The Beatmen
Singles
 Safely Arrived/The Enchanted Lie - 1965 (Supraphon)
 Break It/Let's Make A Summer - 1965 (Supraphon)

With The Soulmen
EP
 Sample Of Happiness/Wake Up/I Wish I Were/Baby Do Not Cry – 1968 (Panton)

Solo career
Studio albums

English album
 Dežo Ursiny & Provisorium – 1973 (Supraphon)

Slovak albums (all but the first one as Dežo Ursiny – Ivan Štrpka):
 Pevnina detstva (Childhood's Mainland) – 1978 (Opus)
 Nové mapy ticha (New Maps Of Silence) – 1979 (Opus)
 Modrý vrch (Blue Hill) – 1981 (Opus)
 4/4 – 1983 (Opus)
 Bez počasia (Without Weather) – 1984 (Opus)
 Zelená (Green) – 1986 (Opus)
 Na ceste domov (On The Way Home) – 1987 (Opus)
 Momentky (Snapshots) – 1990 (Opus)
 Do tla (Burned To Embers) – 1991 (Opus)
 Ten istý tanec (The Same Dance) – 1992 (Arta)
 Príbeh (Story) – 1994 (BMG Ariola)

Compilation albums:
 Pevniny a vrchy (Mainlands And Hills) – 1997 (Bonton/Slovenský rozhlas)
 Pevniny a vrchy 2 (Mainlands And Hills 2) – 2000 (Sony Music Bonton)

Live:
 Posledný príbeh live (The Last Story Live) – 2000 (Rádio Bratislava)

Single:
 Hra je hra/Stá pieseň o daždi – 1980

See also
 The Beatmen
 The Soulmen
 Jaroslav Filip
 The 100 Greatest Slovak Albums of All Time

Notes

External links

1947 births
1995 deaths
Czechoslovak Big Beat groups and musicians
Slovak musicians
Deaths from cancer in Slovakia